Powder My Back is a 1928 silent film comedy directed by Roy Del Ruth and starring Irene Rich. It was produced and distributed by Warner Bros. who released it with a Vitaphone music and sound effects track.

Plot 

The actress of the comedy "powder My back", Fritzi Foy, was angry with Rex Hale, the mayor who closes the comedy. With the help of Fritzi's press agent, Claude, she succeeds to enter the mayor's home by performing an fake accident and tells him that she need to leave until her fully recovered. This action infuriated Hale, however, his son Jack falls in love with Fritzi. When Fritzi figures out that her action has brought misfortune to Jack, she persuade him to go back to his fiancé, Ruth Stevens.

Cast
Irene Rich as Fritzi Foy
Audrey Ferris as Ruth Stevens
George Beranger as Claude
Anders Randolf as Rex Hale
Carroll Nye as Jack Hale

Preservation status
This is now a lost film.

References

External links

lobby card

1928 films
American silent feature films
Films directed by Roy Del Ruth
Lost American films
Warner Bros. films
American black-and-white films
1928 comedy films
1928 lost films
Silent American comedy films
1920s American films